Mary Sturt (8 September 1896 - 1993), also known as Molly, was a British educational psychologist and historian of education. She was Vice-Principal of St Mary's College, Bangor, an Anglican teacher-training college for women.

Sturt collaborated with Ellen Oakden in several pieces of writing. Their Modern Psychology and Education (1926) was welcomed by its Observer reviewer as "one of the most informative, interesting, and humorous things that I have ever seen as an attempt to write for training-college students". They also adapted works for children for 'The King's Treasuries of Literature', a series edited by Arthur Quiller-Couch: The Canterbury Pilgrims bowdlerised some of the bawdier elements of the Canterbury Tales.

Sturt's biography of Francis Bacon defended Bacon against Macaulay, whom she characterised as "a man writing in semi-ignorance to please the most hypocritical audience that ever existed". On retirement she taught for a year in Sarawak in Borneo.

Works
 (with E. C. Oakden) 'The development of the knowledge of time in children', British Journal of Psychology, vol. 12 (1922), pp. 309–336
 The psychology of time, London: K. Paul, Trench, Trubner & Co., Ltd, 1925. 'The International Library of Psychology, Philosophy and Scientific Method' series.
 (with E. C. Oakden) Pattern plays, a book of plays and play-making, 1925. 'Teaching of English' series, no. 20.
 (with E. C. Oakden) Modern psychology and education : a text-book of psychology for students in training colleges and adult evening classes, 1926
 (with E. C. Oakden) Matter and method in education, 1928
 (with E. C. Oakden) Growing up : How One did it in Different Times and Places, 1930
 Francis Bacon: a biography, 1932
 The education of children under seven, 1932
 (with E. C. Oakden) The Canterbury pilgrims, being Chaucers Canterbury tales retold for children, 1937. 'The King's Treasuries of Literature' series.
 Practical ethics: a sketch of the moral structure of society, 1949
 The education of the people: a history of primary education in England and Wales in the nineteenth century, 1967
 (with E. C. Oakden) Minstral tales. 'The King's Treasuries of Literature' series.
 (with E. C. Oakden) The knights of the Faery Queen: tales retold from Spenser. 'The King's Treasuries of Literature' series.

References

1896 births
1994 deaths
Year of death uncertain
British psychologists
Educational psychologists
British educational theorists
Historians of education
20th-century psychologists